The Moldova national rugby sevens team is a minor national sevens side. Moldova finished third at the 2007 European Sevens Championship. For the 2022 season, the team played in the Rugby Europe Sevens Conference 1.

See also
Moldova national rugby union team
Moldovan Rugby Federation

References

Rugby union in Moldova
Moldova national rugby union team
National rugby sevens teams